The EVB Eagles Südtirol, previously known as the EV Bozen Eagles during 2008 to 2017, are an ice hockey team in the European Women's Hockey League (EWHL) and the Italian Hockey League Women (IHLW; previously the ). They play in Bolzano, the capital city of the northern Italian province of South Tyrol, at the PalaOnda.

History

EV Bozen 84
Eishockey Verein Bozen 84 ('Ice Hockey Club Bolzano 84') or EV Bozen 84 was created as a junior men's ice hockey club in 1984 via the merger of four teams in the Bolzano area – SV Gries, HC Rentsch, HC Jugendclub, and Micky Maus. The club's representative team played in the Serie A2 and Serie C, the second and third levels of Italian men's ice hockey. The team's colors were blue and white and they played at the Sill Ice Sport Centre. Nicknamed the Old Weasels and the White Weasels, the team ceased operation in 2015 and the EV Bozen 84 representative team became a junior team. Between 2015 and 2018, the club's men's junior teams merged with those of the Hockey Academy Bolzano and the men's section of the club was dissolved.

Achievements
 Serie C U26 champion: 2010

Head coaches
  Andreas Bentenrieder, 2009–10
  Egon Schenk, 2010–11
  Massimo Fedrizzi & Egon Schenk, 2011–12
  Fred Carroll, 2012–13
  Tuomo Harjula &  Marco Liberatore, 2014–15

EV Bozen Eagles
The EV Bozen Eagles were founded by EV Bozen 84 in 2008, following the dissolution of the local women's ice hockey club, HC Eagles Bolzano, which had existed during 1991 to 2008. The EV Bozen Eagles have participated in the Italian Hockey League Women (IHLW) since the team's creation in 2008 and are the most successful team in league history, with eleven Italian Championship titles.

Since the 2012–13 season, they have also competed in the European Women's Hockey League (previously the Elite Women's Hockey League) in addition to playing in the IHLW. The Eagles won the EWHL Championship in 2013–14 and 2016–17, and also achieved EWHL silver medals in 2014–15 and 2017–18 and the EWHL bronze medal in 2018–19.

EV Bozen participated in the IIHF European Women's Champions Cup tournaments in 2010–11, 2011–12, 2012–13, 2013–14, and 2014–15. They qualified for the second round, their highest finishes in the tournament, in both 2012–13 and 2014–15.

Team achievements

Italian Championship 
  Champions (11): 2009–10, 2010–11, 2011–12, 2012–13, 2013–14, 2014–15, 2015–16, 2016–17, 2017–18, 2020–21, 2021–22
  Runners-up (1): 2018–19

EWHL Championship
  Champions (2): 2013–14, 2016–17
  Silver (2): 2014–15, 2017–18
  Bronze (1): 2018–19

Players and personnel

Team captaincy history 
 Chelsea Furlani, –2019
 Valentina Bettarini & Chelsea Furlani, 2019–20
 Samantha Gius, 2021–

Head coaches 
 Massimo Fedrizzi, –2014
 Marco Liberatore, 2014–15
 Fredy Püls, 2015–2020
 Stefano Daprà, 2020–

Notable alumnae
Years active with the EVB Eagles listed alongside player name.

 Michela Angeloni, 2008–2014
 Evelyn Bazzanella, 2009–2014
 Diana Da Rugna, 2009–2015
 Anna De la Forest, 2012–2015
 Linda De Rocco, 2012–2016
 Rebecca Fiorese, 2008–2010
 Waltraud Kaser, 2009–2013

International players
 Alexandra Gowie, 2017–18

References

External links
  
  
 Archived official website of the EV Bozen 84 team

Bozen
Sport in Bolzano
European Women's Hockey League teams
Ice hockey clubs established in 2008
2008 establishments in Italy